Anja Bah Žibert (born 27 June 1973) is a Slovenian politician, currently serving as member of the Slovenian National Assembly.

References

1973 births
Slovenian Democratic Party politicians
21st-century Slovenian women politicians
21st-century Slovenian politicians
Living people